This is a list of notable people born in, or associated with, the city of Swansea, in Britain.

Academics
Sir Granville Beynon, FRS, physicist
Edward George Bowen, FRS, radar pioneer
Joan Curran, scientist
Huw Dixon, economist
Sir Sam Edwards FRS, physicist
Brian Flowers, Baron Flowers, FRS, physicist
Sir Clive Granger, Nobel Prize–winning economist
Sir William Robert Grove, FRS, physicist and judge
Uzo Iwobi, OBE, lecturer 
John Gwyn Jeffreys, FRS, conchologist, malacologist
Ernest Jones, psychoanalyst
John Viriamu Jones, FRS, mathematician, physicist
David Ley, FRSC, geographer
Sir John Maddox, Hon. FRS, science writer
Arun Midha, medical educationist
Dewi Zephaniah Phillips, philosopher
Bill Price, physicist
David Williams FRS, mathematician
C. E. Wynn-Williams, physicist
Olgierd Zienkiewicz CBE FRS FREng, mathematician, engineer

Actors and actresses
Keith Allen
Kevin Allen
Gareth Armstrong
Desmond Barrit
Rob Brydon
Geraint Wyn Davies
Mabel Hackney
Georgia Henshaw
Gary Jones
Ruth Madoc
Steven Meo
Islwyn Morris
Siwan Morris
Richard Mylan
Joanna Page
Robert Perkins
Ceri Phillips
Cara Readle
Vincent Regan
Matt Ryan
Philip Sayer
Andy Secombe, voice actor
Harry Secombe
John Sparkes
Talfryn Thomas
Alexander Vlahos
Melanie Walters
Tom Ward
Catherine Zeta-Jones

Artists
Alfred Janes
Mervyn Levy
Thyrza Anne Leyshon
Cedric Morris
Finbarr O'Reilly, photographer
Ceri Richards
Glan Williams

Industrialists
Lewis Llewelyn Dillwyn
George Lockwood Morris
Sir John Morris, 1st Baronet
Christopher Rice Mansel Talbot
David Thomas
Henry Vivian, 1st Baron Swansea
John Henry Vivian

Journalists and broadcasters
Colin Edwards, radio journalist and filmmaker
Huw Edwards, TV presenter
Charles Fisher, journalist and poet
Liz Fuller, model and TV presenter
Ian Hislop, comedian, satirist, editor of Private Eye magazine
Phil Kerslake, TV presenter
David Mercer, sports presenter
Rhodri Owen, radio and TV presenter
Davinia Palmer, radio and TV presenter
Anna Ryder Richardson
Wynford Vaughan-Thomas

Musicians
Badfinger, rock music group
Richard Barrett, composer
Rachel K Collier, singer/songwriter
Lisa Lee Dark, singer
Spencer Davis, rock musician
Howell Glynne, operatic bass
Fred Godfrey, songwriter
Pete Ham, singer/songwriter
Jones Hewson, baritone
Shaheen Jafargholi, singer
Karl Jenkins, composer
Daniel Jones, composer
Ceri Rhys Matthews, traditional musician
John Metcalf, composer
Rebecca Onslow, singer/songwriter
Mal Pope, singer/songwriter
Hannah Stone, harpist
The Storys, rock band
Elin Manahan Thomas, soprano
Trampolene, rock band
Bonnie Tyler, singer
Viva Machine, alternative rock group
Gareth Walters, composer
John Weathers, rock drummer
Terry Williams, drummer (Dire Straits)

Politicians
Donald Anderson, Baron Anderson of Swansea
Suzy Davies
Sir John Dillwyn-Llewellyn, 1st Baronet
Nigel Evans
Ted Grace
David Grenfell
Mike Hedges
Michael Heseltine
Michael Howard
Huw Irranca-Davies
Siân James
William Albert Jenkins
Carwyn Jones
David Brynmor Jones
Leifchild Leif-Jones, 1st Baron Rhayader
Sir Julian Lewis
Percy Morris
Colin Phipps
Gwyn Prosser
Hugh Rees
Rees G. Richards
James Thomas, portreeve of Swansea

Religious leaders
Cenydd, saint and hermit
Graham Charles Chadwick, bishop, anti-apartheid campaigner
Llewellyn Henry Gwynne, bishop in Sudan
Griffith John, Christian missionary and translator in China
Norman Matthews, chancellor of Llandaff diocese
Anthony Pierce, bishop of Swansea and Brecon
Evan Roberts, minister
Glyn Simon, archbishop of Wales
Rhys Derrick Chamberlain Walters, dean of Liverpool Anglican cathedral
Rowan Williams, archbishop of Canterbury

Sports people
Jimmy Austin, baseball player
Nicole Cooke, cyclist
Brian Curvis, boxer
Dai Dower, boxer
Tracy Edwards, yachtswoman
Philip George, cricketer
Nikara Jenkins, rhythmic gymnast
Alan Jones, cricketer
Eifion Jones, cricketer
Simon Jones, cricketer
Enzo Maccarinelli, boxer
Gilbert Parkhouse, cricketer
Carl Roberts, cricketer
Don Shepherd, cricketer
Non Stanford, 2013 World Champion triathlete
Gary Taylor, 1993 World's Strongest Man
Rob Terry, wrestler
Imad Wasim, cricketer, born in Swansea but represents Pakistan

Footballers
Daniel Alfei
Ivor Allchurch
John Charles
Mel Charles
Chris Coleman
Ray Daniel
Richard Duffy
Trevor Ford
Bill Harris
Mark Harris
John Hartson
Robbie James
Cliff Jones
Dennis Lambourne
Aaron Lewis
Andy Melville
Mel Nurse
Jackie Roberts
Joe Rodon
Dean Saunders
Gary Sprake

Rugby players
William Richard Arnold
Dan Biggar
Bleddyn Bowen
Mervyn Davies
James Hook
Alun Wyn Jones
Ivor Jones
Lewis Jones
Ryan Jones
Douglas Marsden-Jones
Paul Moriarty
Richard Moriarty
George Lockwood Morris
Dicky Owen
Idwal Rees
Billy Trew
Shane Williams

Writers
Martin Amis, novelist
Mary Balogh, novelist
Russell T Davies, Doctor Who screenwriter
Amy Dillwyn, novelist and businesswoman
Joe Dunthorne, poet, novelist
Mark Ellis, author
Stuart Evans (1934–1994), novelist and poet
Paul Ferris
Iris Gower, novelist
Bryn Griffiths, poet
Cyril Gwynn, oral poet
Ann Hatton, novelist
Nigel Jenkins, poet
Stephen Knight, poet
Gary Ley, novelist
Bob Lock, novelist
Ruth Manning-Sanders, children's author and poet
Jon Mitchell, author and journalist
T. J. Morgan
Alex Norris, cartoonist
John Ormond, poet
John Pook, poet
Jason Shepherd, author and Welsh language advocate
Dylan Thomas, poet/playwright
Vernon Watkins, poet
Harri Webb, poet

Other

Silvanus Bevan, FRS, apothecary
Sybil Connolly, fashion designer
Catherine Lynch, 19th-century petty criminal
Edgar Evans, Antarctic explorer
Francis Grenfell, 1st Baron Grenfell, field marshal and Egyptologist
Frederick Higginson, RAF fighter ace
Hugh Llewellyn Glyn Hughes, medical administrator
Andrew Jones, film maker
Edward Kenway, pirate, assassin
Princess Lilian, Duchess of Halland
John Dillwyn Llewelyn, pioneer photographer, botanist
Sean Mathias, theatre director, film director
David Miles, economist
Beau Nash, socialite, dandy
Heather Nicholson, animal rights activist
Red Lady of Paviland, Upper Palaeolithic remains
Henry Pheloung, New Zealand bandsman, labourer and carrier
Richard Valentine Pitchford, 'Carlini', magician and entertainer
Richard Glynn Vivian, art collector
Alan Woods, political theorist

See also
List of Welsh people

  
Swansea
Swa